Desperadoes' Outpost is a 1952 American Western film directed by Philip Ford and starring Allan Lane, Roy Barcroft and Eddy Waller.

The film's sets were designed by the art director Frank Hotaling.

Cast
 Allan Lane as Rocky Lane 
 Black Jack as Black Jack  
 Eddy Waller as Nugget Clark 
 Roy Barcroft as Jim Boylan  
 Myron Healey as Lieutenant Dan Booker  
 Lyle Talbot as Walter Fleming  
 Claudia Barrett as Kathy  
 Lane Bradford as Henchman Mike  
 Lee Roberts as Henchman Spec Matson 
 Ed Cassidy as Deputy Marshal  
 Charles Evans as Major Seeley  
 Zon Murray as Henchman  
 Slim Duncan as Sergeant 
 Art Dillard as Henchman  
 Boyd Stockman as Henchman Tom

References

Bibliography
 Bernard A. Drew. Motion Picture Series and Sequels: A Reference Guide. Routledge, 2013.

External links
 

1952 films
1952 Western (genre) films
American Western (genre) films
Films directed by Philip Ford
Republic Pictures films
American black-and-white films
1950s English-language films
1950s American films